1322 Coppernicus, provisional designation , is a stony background asteroid from the inner regions of the asteroid belt, approximately 10 kilometers in diameter. Discovered by Karl Reinmuth at Heidelberg Observatory in 1934, the asteroid was later named after Polish astronomer Nicolaus Copernicus.

Discovery 

Coppernicus was discovered on 15 June 1934, by German astronomer Karl Reinmuth at the Heidelberg-Königstuhl State Observatory in southwest Germany. On the same night, it was independently discovered by Belgian astronomer Eugène Delporte at Uccle Observatory. The Minor Planet Center only recognizes the first discoverer.

Orbit and classification 

Coppernicus is a non-family asteroid from the main belt's background population. It orbits the Sun in the inner asteroid belt at a distance of 1.9–3.0 AU once every 3 years and 9 months (1,377 days; semi-major axis of 2.42 AU). Its orbit has an eccentricity of 0.23 and an inclination of 23° with respect to the ecliptic. The body's observation arc begins at Heidelberg/Uccle in June 1934, on the night of its official discovery observation.

Physical characteristics 

In the Tholen classification, Coppernicus is a common, stony S-type asteroid.

Rotation period 

Published in 1991, a first rotational lightcurve of Coppernicus was obtained by Polish astronomer Wiesław Wiśniewski. Lightcurve analysis gave a relatively short rotation period of 3.967 hours with a brightness variation of 0.22 magnitude. In 2006, photometric observations by Italian astronomer Federico Manzini gave a tentative period of 5.37 and 5.375 hours with an amplitude of 0.01 and 0.04, respectively.

Diameter and albedo 

According to the surveys carried out by the Japanese Akari satellite and the NEOWISE mission of NASA's Wide-field Infrared Survey Explorer, Coppernicus measures between 9.996 and 10.70 kilometers in diameter and its surface has an albedo between 0.133 and 0.211.

The Collaborative Asteroid Lightcurve Link assumes a standard albedo for stony asteroids of 0.20 and derives a diameter of 9.80 kilometers based on an absolute magnitude of 12.41.

Naming 

This minor planet was named after Polish astronomer and mathematician Nicolaus Copernicus (1473–1543), the founder of modern astronomy who formulated the heliocentric model that placed the Sun rather than the Earth at the center of the Universe. The official naming citation was mentioned in The Names of the Minor Planets by Paul Herget in 1955. The lunar crater Copernicus as well as the Martian crater Copernicus are both named in his honor. The asteroid's unusual spelling, "Coppernicus", is attributed to German biographer Leopold Prowe.

Notes

References

External links 
 Asteroid Lightcurve Database (LCDB), query form (info )
 Dictionary of Minor Planet Names, Google books
 Asteroids and comets rotation curves, CdR – Observatoire de Genève, Raoul Behrend
 Discovery Circumstances: Numbered Minor Planets (1)-(5000) – Minor Planet Center
 
 

001322
Discoveries by Karl Wilhelm Reinmuth
Named minor planets
19340615